Mian Rud (also Romanized as Mīān Rūd) is a village in Goli Jan Rural District, in the Central District of Tonekabon County, Mazandaran Province, Iran. At the 2006 census, its population was 199, in 60 families.

References 

Populated places in Tonekabon County